Filippos Margaritis (1810–1892) is generally acknowledged to have been the first Greek photographer, whose earliest daguerreotypes, of the Acropolis of Athens, date from 1847. Having studied painting in lithography in Paris, he opened a studio in [Athens] in 1837 and began teaching at the School of Fine Arts in 1842. He learned the techniques of the daguerreotypes from the French photographer Philibert Perraud who arrived in Greece in 1847, and in turn passed on his knowledge to the students of Athens Polytechnic around 1850.

Later, he moved on to producing calotypes and albumen prints on paper, including views of the antiquities of Athens as well as formal portraits of Athenian society including members of the courts of King Otto and his successor George I.

He travelled abroad frequently, often to exhibit his work at international exhibitions and fairs. He died in his sister’s home in Würzburg on 1 April 1892.

References

Bibliography 
Alkis Xanthakis, Filippos Margaritis, Fotografos Editions, Athens 1990 (64 pp.)

Greek educators
Greek photographers
1810 births
1892 deaths
Smyrniote Greeks